Bonnie Erickson (born September 20, 1941) is an American designer of puppets, costumes, toys, and graphics, best known for her work with Jim Henson and The Muppets, where her most notable creations include Miss Piggy, Statler and Waldorf, and as a partner in Harrison/Erickson, the Major League Baseball mascot the Phillie Phanatic.

Biography

Jim Henson Company and The Muppets
Erickson began her career with a background in theater and art, having studied at the University of Minnesota and the Art Students League of New York.  After working in legitimate theater as assistant to costume designer Patricia Quinn Stewart, she was hired by Jim Henson in 1970 to provide costumes for the Muppet characters in The Frog Prince.  She continued with the company, specializing in puppets made from carved foam like Miss Piggy and Statler and Waldorf.

Erickson served as Head of the Muppet Workshop for Jim Henson Associates, and set up the original London workshop for The Muppet Show.

In 1983, Erickson served as Design Consultant and Workshop Director for the Jim Henson series Fraggle Rock.

In 1986, Erickson became Vice President of Creative Projects for The Jim Henson Company in which she worked on productions such as The Tale of the Bunny Picnic and The Christmas Toy.

Erickson served as a Creative Director for the product division of The Jim Henson Company and Children's Television Workshop from 1987 to 2000, in which time she art directed the creation of the popular children's toy Tickle Me Elmo.

Harrison/Erickson, Inc.
In 1977, she and Wayde Harrison established Harrison/Erickson, Inc., a design and marketing resource for national sports teams, television production and the advertising and toy industries, with Jim Henson Associates as their first client.

Erickson designed many professional sports mascots, including the Phillie Phanatic and Youppi!, now in the National Baseball Hall of Fame and Museum.

The Jim Henson Legacy
In 1994, Erickson became a trustee of the Jim Henson Legacy, a nonprofit organization dedicated to preserving and perpetuating Jim Henson’s contributions to the worlds of puppetry, television, motion pictures, special effects and media technology.  From 2007 to 2010, she served as president, and then Executive Director until 2014.  During her tenure, she oversaw the Henson Family collection of objects from Henson productions at the Smithsonian Institution, Center for Puppetry Arts, Museum of the Moving Image, The Strong, and Museum of Pop Culture.

Erickson was also instrumental in the installation of a statue of Jim Henson and Kermit the Frog at the University of Maryland.  The caricature Muppet of Jim Henson she created inspired the action figure by Palisades Toys.

Erickson's notable credits

The Muppets

 The Muppet Musicians of Bremen, Puppet Designer/Builder for Caleb Siles, Mean Floyd, Mordecai Sledge, and Lardpork. (1972)
 Designer/Builder of caricature puppets of Jim Henson and Frank Oz, and Designer of Jerry Nelson, first seen on The Dick Cavett Show (1973)
 The Muppets Valentine Show, Puppet Designer/Builder for George the Janitor, Designer of Mildred Huxtetter (1974)
 The Muppet Show: Sex and Violence, Puppet Costume Designer.  Designed and built Miss Piggy, Statler and Waldorf, the Muppet Newsman, Dr. Nauga (eventually became Dr. Julius Strangepork), and the Gene Shallit caricature puppet.  Designer of Zoot.  Co-designed Animal.  Built Janice.  Co-built The Swedish Chef. (1974)
 Saturday Night Live The Land of Gorch sketches, built Vazh. (1975)
 The Muppet Show, Builder of Fozzie Bear (1976)

Mascots

 Phillie Phanatic, mascot for Philadelphia Phillies (1978–present)
 Youppi!, mascot for Montreal Expos (1979-2004)/Canadiens (2005-present)
 Sharpo, mascot for Sharp Electronics (1979-1982)
 Big Shot, mascot for Philadelphia 76ers (1979-1994)
 Hoops, mascot for Philadelphia 76ers (1979-1983)
 Dandy, mascot for New York Yankees (1979-1981)
 Ribbie and Roobarb, mascot for Chicago White Sox (1982-1990)
 Duncan the Dragon, mascot for New Jersey Nets (1982-1991)
 K.C. Wolf, mascot for Kansas City Chiefs (1989–present)
 Booster, mascot for Houston Rockets (1989-1993)
 Hugo, mascot for Charlotte Hornets (1989–present)
 Stuff the Magic Dragon, mascot for Orlando Magic (1989–present)
 Jaxson de Ville, mascot for Jacksonville Jaguars (1995–present)
 Pirate Pete, mascot for Delaware River & Bridge Authority (1995–present)
 Slyly, mascot for Hiroshima Toyo Carp (1995–present)
 G-Whiz, mascot for Washington Wizards (1998–present)
 Phred, mascot for Philadelphia Phillies (2000–present)

Advertising clients

 Burger King
 Cadbury
 Budweiser
 McDonald’s
 AT&T
 Nutella
 American Dairy Association
 Lysol
 Sharp Corporation
 Bell Atlantic
 Bette Midler's The Divine Miss Millennium Tour

Notable toy and product manufacturer clients
 Applause, Inc.
 Axlon
 Enesco
 Fisher-Price
 Hasbro
 Knickerbocker Toy Company
 Colorforms for Maurice Sendak
 Mattel
 Kurt S. Adler

References

External links
 
 The Jim Henson Legacy

Living people
1941 births
American fashion designers
American women fashion designers
American women artists
Art Students League of New York alumni
Muppet designers
People from Anoka, Minnesota
University of Minnesota alumni